The Idaho State University Administration Building is a historic two-story building on the campus of Idaho State University in Pocatello, Idaho. It was built as a student union in 1939, and designed in the Art Deco style by architect Frank G. Paradice. It became the administration building in 1961, after it was renovated by architect Henry J. Hulvey. It has been listed on the National Register of Historic Places since September 23, 1993.

References

University and college administration buildings in the United States
Art Deco architecture in Idaho
National Register of Historic Places in Bannock County, Idaho
University and college buildings completed in 1939
1939 establishments in Idaho
Administration Building